The Hynes Athletics Center is a 2,578-seat multi-purpose arena in New Rochelle, New York. It was built in 1974 and is home to the Iona College Gaels basketball and volleyball teams.

In 2005, the building was renamed the Hynes Center, after being formerly known as the John A. Mulcahy Campus Events Center.

Between the summer and fall of 2019, Hynes Athletics Center received a total of $6.5 million to expand and modernize the athletic center.  The athletic center's renovations were completed in October 2019.

See also
 List of NCAA Division I basketball arenas

References

External links
 Iona College - official website
 ICGaels.com - official athletics website

College basketball venues in the United States
Sports venues in New York (state)
Indoor arenas in New York (state)
Iona Gaels basketball
Sports venues in Westchester County, New York
Iona University
1974 establishments in New York (state)
Sports venues completed in 1974
Basketball venues in New York (state)
College volleyball venues in the United States
Volleyball venues in New York (state)